Justice Griffin may refer to:

John Griffin (judge) (fl. 1770s–1800s), associate justice of the Supreme Court of Michigan Territory
Joseph Ruble Griffin (1923–1988), associate justice of the Mississippi Supreme Court
Meade F. Griffin (1894–1974), associate justice of the Texas Supreme Court
Piper D. Griffin (born 1962), associate justice of the Louisiana Supreme Court
Robert P. Griffin (1923–2015), associate justice of the Michigan Supreme Court

See also
Judge Griffin (disambiguation)